Tamiyasu Dam  is an earthfill dam located in Hokkaido Prefecture in Japan. The dam is used for irrigation. The catchment area of the dam is 6.2 km2. The dam impounds about 39  ha of land when full and can store 2000 thousand cubic meters of water. The construction of the dam was started on 1984 and completed in 2001.

References

Dams in Hokkaido